Zápotoka is a Slovak surname. Notable people with the surname include:

Ján Zápotoka (born 1988), Slovak footballer
Lukáš Zápotoka (born 1985), Slovak footballer
Tomáš Zápotoka (born 1987), Slovak footballer

Slovak-language surnames